Tartaric acid is a white, crystalline organic acid that occurs naturally in many fruits, most notably in grapes, but also in  bananas, tamarinds, and citrus. Its salt, potassium bitartrate, commonly known as cream of tartar, develops naturally in the process of fermentation. It is commonly mixed with sodium bicarbonate and is sold as baking powder used as a leavening agent in food preparation.  The acid itself is added to foods as an antioxidant E334 and to impart its distinctive sour taste. Naturally occurring tartaric acid is a useful raw material in organic chemical synthesis. Tartaric acid is an alpha-hydroxy-carboxylic acid, is diprotic and aldaric in acid characteristics, and is a dihydroxyl derivative of succinic acid.

History
Tartaric acid has been known to winemakers for centuries. However, the chemical process for extraction was developed in 1769 by the Swedish chemist Carl Wilhelm Scheele.

Tartaric acid played an important role in the discovery of chemical chirality. This property of tartaric acid was first observed in 1832 by Jean Baptiste Biot, who observed its ability to rotate polarized light. Louis Pasteur continued this research in 1847 by investigating the shapes of sodium ammonium tartrate crystals, which he found to be chiral. By manually sorting the differently shaped crystals, Pasteur was the first to produce a pure sample of levotartaric acid.

Stereochemistry 

Naturally occurring form of the acid is dextro tartaric acid  or L-(+)-tartaric acid (obsolete name d-tartaric acid).  Because it is available naturally, it is cheaper than its enantiomer and the meso isomer. The dextro and levo prefixes are archaic terms. Modern textbooks refer to the natural form as (2R,3R)-tartaric acid (L-(+)-tartaric acid), and its enantiomer as (2S,3S)-tartaric acid (D-(-)-tartaric acid).  The meso diastereomer is referred to as (2R,3S)-tartaric acid or (2S,3R)-tartaric acid.

Dextro and levo form monoclinic sphenoidal crystals and orthorhombic crystals.
Racemic tartaric acid forms monoclinic and triclinic crystals (space group P). 
Anhydrous meso tartaric acid form two anhydrous polymorphs: triclinic and orthorhombic.
Monohydrated meso tartaric acid crystallizes as monoclinic and triclinic polymorphys depending on the temperature at which crystallization from aqueous solution occurs.
Tartaric acid in Fehling's solution binds to copper(II) ions, preventing the formation of insoluble hydroxide salts.

Production

L-(+)-Tartaric acid
The L-(+)-tartaric acid isomer of tartaric acid is industrially produced in the largest amounts. It is obtained from lees, a solid byproduct of fermentations. The former byproducts mostly consist of potassium bitartrate (KHC4H4O6). This potassium salt is converted to calcium tartrate (CaC4H4O6) upon treatment with calcium hydroxide "milk of lime" (Ca(OH)2):
KH(C4H4O6) + Ca(OH)2 -> Ca(C4H4O6) + KOH + H2O
In practice, higher yields of calcium tartrate are obtained with the addition of calcium chloride.  Calcium tartrate is then converted to tartaric acid by treating the salt with aqueous sulfuric acid:
Ca(C4H4O6)  +  H2SO4  ->   H2(C4H4O6)  + CaSO4

Racemic tartaric acid
Racemic tartaric acid can be prepared in a multistep reaction from maleic acid. In the first step, the maleic acid is epoxidized by hydrogen peroxide using potassium tungstate as a catalyst.
HO2CC2H2CO2H + H2O2 → OC2H2(CO2H) 2
In the next step, the epoxide is hydrolyzed.
OC2H2(CO2H)2  +  H2O   →   (HOCH)2(CO2H)2

meso-Tartaric acid
A mixture of racemic acid and meso-tartaric acid is formed when dextro-Tartaric acid is heated in water at 165 °C for about 2 days. meso-Tartaric acid can also be prepared from dibromosuccinic acid using silver hydroxide:
HO2CCHBrCHBrCO2H + 2 AgOH → HO2CCH(OH)CH(OH)CO2H + 2 AgBr
meso-Tartaric acid can be separated from residual racemic acid by crystallization, the racemate being less soluble.

Reactivity
L-(+)-tartaric acid, can participate in several reactions. As shown the reaction scheme below, dihydroxymaleic acid is produced upon treatment of L-(+)-tartaric acid with hydrogen peroxide in the presence of a ferrous salt.
 
HO2CCH(OH)CH(OH)CO2H + H2O2 → HO2CC(OH)C(OH)CO2H + 2 H2O

Dihydroxymaleic acid can then be oxidized to tartronic acid with nitric acid.

Derivatives

Important derivatives of tartaric acid include its salts, cream of tartar (potassium bitartrate), Rochelle salt (potassium sodium tartrate, a mild laxative), and tartar emetic (antimony potassium tartrate). Diisopropyl tartrate is used as a co-catalyst in asymmetric synthesis.

Tartaric acid is a muscle toxin, which works by inhibiting the production of malic acid, and in high doses causes paralysis and death. The median lethal dose (LD50) is about 7.5 grams/kg for a human, 5.3 grams/kg for rabbits, and 4.4 grams/kg for mice. As a food additive, tartaric acid is used as an antioxidant with E number E334; tartrates are other additives serving as antioxidants or emulsifiers.

When cream of tartar is added to water, a suspension results which serves to clean copper coins very well, as the tartrate solution can dissolve the layer of copper(II) oxide present on the surface of the coin. The resulting copper(II)-tartrate complex is easily soluble in water.

Tartaric acid in wine

Tartaric acid may be most immediately recognizable to wine drinkers as the source of "wine diamonds", the small potassium bitartrate crystals that sometimes form spontaneously on the cork or bottom of the bottle. These "tartrates" are harmless, despite sometimes being mistaken for broken glass, and are prevented in many wines through cold stabilization (which is not always preferred since it can change the wine's profile). The tartrates remaining on the inside of aging barrels were at one time a major industrial source of potassium bitartrate.

Tartaric acid plays an important role chemically, lowering the pH of fermenting "must" to a level where many undesirable spoilage bacteria cannot live, and acting as a preservative after fermentation. In the mouth, tartaric acid provides some of the tartness in the wine, although citric and malic acids also play a role.

Tartaric acid in citrus 
Results from a study showed that in citrus, fruits produced in organic farming contain higher levels of tartaric acid than fruits produced in conventional agriculture.

Applications 
Tartaric acid and its derivatives have a plethora of uses in the field of pharmaceuticals. For example, it has been used in the production of effervescent salts, in combination with citric acid, to improve the taste of oral medications. The potassium antimonyl derivative of the acid known as tartar emetic is included, in small doses, in cough syrup as an expectorant.

Tartaric acid also has several applications for industrial use. The acid has been observed to chelate metal ions such as calcium and magnesium. Therefore, the acid has served in the farming and metal industries as a chelating agent for complexing micronutrients in soil fertilizer and for cleaning metal surfaces consisting of aluminium, copper, iron, and alloys of these metals, respectively.

Toxicity in canines 
While tartaric acid is well-tolerated by humans and lab animals, an April 2021 letter to the editor of JAVMA hypothesized that the tartaric acid in grapes could be the cause of grape and raisin toxicity in dogs.

References

External links

PDB file for MSE 

Crystals in space group 14
Chirality
Racemic mixtures
Food antioxidants
Food acidity regulators
Acids in wine
Alpha hydroxy acids
Dicarboxylic acids
Vicinal diols
E-number additives